Miroslav Šugar (born 29 September 1957) is a Croatian retired football defender.

Career
He also played as defensive midfielder. Born in Novi Sad, SR Serbia, during his career he played with NK Rijeka and Red Star Belgrade in the Yugoslav First League, and later, with HNK Šibenik in Yugoslav Second League, and Waterschei. A season later this club was merged with Winterslag to form Racing Genk, with Šugar thus playing with Genk in the Belgian First Division.

Career statistics

Honours
NK Rijeka
Yugoslav Cup (2): 1977-78, 1978-79
Balkans Cup (1): 1978

Red Star Belgrade
Yugoslav First League (1): 1983-84
Yugoslav Cup (1): 1984-85

References

External links
 
 Profile at Playerhistory 
 Stats from Yugoslav Leagues at Zerodic

1957 births
Living people
Footballers from Novi Sad
Croats of Vojvodina
Association football defenders
Association football midfielders
Yugoslav footballers
HNK Rijeka players
Red Star Belgrade footballers
HNK Šibenik players
K.R.C. Genk players
Yugoslav First League players
Yugoslav Second League players
Challenger Pro League players
Belgian Pro League players
Yugoslav expatriate footballers
Expatriate footballers in Belgium
Yugoslav expatriate sportspeople in Belgium